The National Health Service Act 2006 (c 41) is an Act of the Parliament of the United Kingdom. It sets out the structure of the National Health Service in England.

It was altered and completely renumbered by the Health and Social Care Act 2012 (c 7).

Contents
Sections 1(1) and (2) replace the corresponding provisions in section 1(1) of the National Health Service Act 1977. Section 1(3) replaces section 1(2) of that Act.

See also
UK public service law
 National Health Service (England), the national healthcare system overhauled by the bill.

Legislation
National Health Service and Community Care Act 1990 (c 19)
National Health Service (Private Finance) Act 1997 (c 56) section 1, on private finance
NHS Redress Act 2006

Notes

References
 Halsbury's Statutes
 National Health Service Act 2006 (C. 41): Table of Origins. HMSO. 2007.

External links
 The National Health Service Act 2006, as amended from the National Archives.
 The National Health Service Act 2006, as originally enacted from the National Archives.

United Kingdom Acts of Parliament 2006
NHS legislation